The 2003 Nigerian Senate election in Taraba State was held on April 12, 2003, to elect members of the Nigerian Senate to represent Taraba State. Ambuno Zik Sunday representing Taraba North, Abdulazeez Ibrahim representing Taraba Central and Danboyi Usman representing Taraba South all won on the platform of the Peoples Democratic Party.

Overview

Summary

Results

Taraba North 
The election was won by Ambuno Zik Sunday of the Peoples Democratic Party.

Taraba Central 
The election was won by Abdulazeez Ibrahim of the Peoples Democratic Party.

Taraba South 
The election was won by Danboyi Usman of the Peoples Democratic Party.

References 

April 2003 events in Nigeria
Taraba State Senate elections
Tar